is a former Japanese football player.

Career
He is naturally a full back, but was utilised mainly as a centre back when playing for Albirex Niigata Singapore in the S.League, due to injuries suffered by Yuki Ichikawa at the beginning of the season. From then on, he has sealed his berth in central defense, partnering Kento Fukuda; and Yuki Ichikawa continued playing as a full back as were before in the 2012 S.League season.

On 25 December 2014, it was announced on his personal Facebook page that he has contracted with J3 League team - Grulla Morioka for the 2015 season.

Club statistics

References

External links

1990 births
Living people
Association football people from Tokushima Prefecture
Japanese footballers
J2 League players
J3 League players
Singapore Premier League players
Tokushima Vortis players
Iwate Grulla Morioka players
Albirex Niigata Singapore FC players
Japanese expatriate footballers
Expatriate footballers in Singapore
Japanese expatriate sportspeople in Singapore
Association football defenders